Inka Friedrich (born 1 November 1965 in Freiburg im Breisgau) is a German actress.

Having studied at the Berlin University of the Arts, Friedrich won the Silver Hugo Award for Best Actress for her starring role in the 2005 film Summer in Berlin.

Biography 
Inka Friedrich grew up with parents and a brother in southern Germany. She attended a high school and received her acting lessons from 1984 to 1988 at the HdK in Berlin. After graduating from drama school, she was hired at the Theater Basel, where she had her first major success as Käthchen von Heilbronn, directed by Cesare Lievi. In 1990, the magazine Theater heute voted her Young Actress of the Year.  From 1991 to 1998 she had her second permanent engagement at the Deutsches Schauspielhaus in Hamburg. Since 1998 she has been working as a freelance actress, her path leading her to the Schauspielhaus Zurich and the Burgtheater in Vienna. She had great success at the Schaubühne am Lehniner Platz in Berlin as "Sonja" in Uncle Vanya, directed by Andrea Breth. She also appeared at the Deutsches Theater in Berlin as "Karoline" in Kasimir und Karoline by Ödön von Horváth, directed by Andreas Dresen.

Selected filmography

References

External links 
 
 

1965 births
Living people
Actors from Freiburg im Breisgau
German film actresses
German television actresses